Eyewitness testimony is the account a bystander or victim gives in the courtroom, describing what that person observed that occurred during the specific incident under investigation. Ideally this recollection of events is detailed; however, this is not always the case. This recollection is used as evidence to show what happened from a witness' point of view. Memory recall has been considered a credible source in the past, but has recently come under attack as forensics can now support psychologists in their claim that memories and individual perceptions can be unreliable, manipulated, and biased. As a result of this, many countries, and states within the United States, are now attempting to make changes in how eyewitness testimony is presented in court. Eyewitness testimony is a specialized focus within cognitive psychology.

Reliability
Psychologists have probed the reliability of eyewitness testimony since the beginning of the 20th century. One prominent pioneer was Hugo Münsterberg, whose controversial book On the Witness Stand (1908) demonstrated the fallibility of eyewitness accounts, but met with fierce criticism, particularly in legal circles. His ideas did, however, gain popularity with the public. Decades later, DNA testing would clear individuals convicted on the basis of errant eyewitness testimony. Studies by Scheck, Neufel, and Dwyer showed that many  DNA-based exonerations involved eyewitness evidence.

In the 1970s and '80s, Bob Buckhout showed inter alia that eyewitness conditions can, within ethical and other constraints, be simulated on university campuses, and that large numbers of people can be mistaken.

In his study, "Nearly 2,000 witnesses can be wrong", Buckhout performed an experiment with 2,145 at-home viewers of a popular news broadcast. The television network played a 13-second clip of a robbery, produced by Buckhout. In the video, viewers watched a man in a hat run up behind a woman, knock her over, and take her purse. The perpetrator's face was only visible for about 3.5 seconds. The clip was followed by the announcer asking participants at home for cooperation in identifying the man who stole the purse. There was a lineup of six male suspects, each having a number associated with them. The people at home could call a number on their screen to report which suspect they believed was the perpetrator. The perpetrator was suspect number 2. Callers also had the option of reporting if they did not believe the perpetrator was in the lineup. Roughly the same percentage of participants chose suspects 1, 2, and 5, while the largest group of participants, about 25 percent, said they believed the perpetrator was not in the lineup. Even police precincts called in to report the wrong man as the one they believed committed the crime. A key purpose of this experiment was aimed toward proving the need for better systems of getting suspect descriptions from eyewitnesses.

The question at hand is what about an event makes it so easy for eyewitness testimonies to be misremembered. As it pertains to witnessing crime in real time, “uniqueness is overshadowed by the conditions for observations”. The surprise or shock of a crime taking place makes it difficult to accurately pay attention to every detail aside from the sensory experiencing or task an individual is already attending to.  Anything that a witness or victim could potentially remember is crowded by a number of factors: time of day, was there enough light to really see the event, number of people surrounding them, what would have made the perpetrator's features stand out in crowd? Potential noises, stress or anxiety induced by the situation, and other distractions all play a huge role in what our mind is perceiving, processing, and remembering.

The mechanisms by which flaws enter eyewitness testimony are varied and can be quite subtle.

One way is a person's memory being influenced by things seen or heard after the crime occurred. This distortion is known as the post-event misinformation effect (Loftus and Palmer, 1974). After a crime occurs and an eyewitness comes forward, law enforcement tries to gather as much information as they can to avoid the influence that may come from the environment, such as the media. Many times when the crime is surrounded by much publicity, an eyewitness may experience source misattribution. Source misattribution occurs when a witness is incorrect about where or when they have the memory from. If a witness cannot correctly identify the source of their retrieved memory, the witness is seen as not reliable.

While some witnesses see the entirety of a crime happen in front of them, some witness only part of a crime. These witnesses are more likely to experience confirmation bias. Witness expectations are to blame for the distortion that may come from confirmation bias. For example, Lindholm and Christianson (1998) found that witnesses of a mock crime who did not witness the whole crime, nevertheless testified to what they expected would have happened. These expectations are normally similar across individuals due to the details of the environment.

Evaluating the credibility of eyewitness testimony falls on all individual jurors when such evidence is offered as testimony in a trial in the United States.  Research has shown that mock juries are often unable to distinguish between a false and accurate eyewitness testimony. "Jurors" often appear to correlate the confidence level of the witness with the accuracy of their testimony. An overview of this research by Laub and Bornstein shows this to be an inaccurate gauge of accuracy.

Research
Research on eyewitness testimony looks at systematic variables or estimator variables. Estimator variables are characteristics of the witness, event, testimony, or testimony evaluators. Systematic variables are variables that are, or have the possibility of, being controlled by the criminal justice system. Both sets of variables can be manipulated and studied during research, but only system variables can be controlled in actual procedure.

Estimator variables

Memory conformity

When a crime occurs and multiple people are around to witness it, the first reaction is usually to go to the person next to you to confirm what you just saw. If you and other witnesses are required to stay at the scene of the crime, you are more likely to talk to more and more people about their perspective. This can lead to memory conformity. Memory conformity is when you report another person's experience as your own. Of course, in some cases this can be a positive thing if enough people saw the right thing and were able to report it accurately. However, most memory conformity comes from wanting your personal experience to match others. Individuals who identified a suspect with blonde hair, but two other people reported they had brown hair, the person who identified blonde hair would most likely change their answers. “People may agree with another person because of normative pressures to conform even when they believe the response is in error.” (Gabbert, Wright, Memon, & Skagerberg, 2012).

Short-term memory

In the event of witnessing a crime, it happens so quickly one can be susceptible to being in a state of shock. Once the initial surprise wears off, an individual can be left wondering what just happened? The problem with witnesses trying to recall such specific information is that short-term memory only keeps items in the brain for about 10 to 15 seconds. This means that if someone is not repeating everything they just witnessed over and over again to convert it over into their working or long-term memory, there is a good chance they can only remember the basic facts of the situation. Perceived or elapsed time can be altered during sudden or surprising events and influence eye witness testimony.

Age of witness
Among children, suggestibility can be very high. Suggestibility is the term used when a witness accepts information after the actual event and incorporates it into the memory of the event itself.  Children's developmental level (generally correlated with age) causes them to be more easily influenced by leading questions, misinformation, and other post-event details. Compared to older children, preschool-age children are more likely to fall victim to suggestions without the ability to focus solely on the facts of what happened.

In addition, a recent meta-analysis found that older adults (over age 65) tend to be more susceptible to memory distortion brought about by misleading post-event information, compared to young adults.

Source monitoring
Source monitoring refers to the hypothetical cognitive processes by which people identify the sources of their recollections. "Most of the time, source monitoring attributions are performed very rapidly and without phenomenal awareness of decision making. Sometimes, however, these rapid, nonreflective processes fail to identify one or more dimensions of source." Applied to an eyewitness' memory of a crime, there are automatic consolidations taking place. There were events that occurred before and after the crime. They also have the influence of what others may have reported about the events of the crime. There are many things a witness might claim or believe to remember, but they may fail to recognize the source of that information.

Reconsolidation 
Every time a witness reflects on an event, it is only natural that the memory can begin to fade or be changed due to reconsolidation. Reconsolidation is where reactivated memories enter a transient state of instability in which they are prone to disruption or change. While, memory reconsolidation is often thought to weaken memories, it is also involved in strengthening memories, and updating them with new information.  Schacter and Loftus (2013) cited that "Reconsolidation may be a mechanism for updating memories with current information to keep them relevant. In so doing, however, this updating mechanism may also contribute to changes and distortions in memory over time as a consequence of memory reactivation."

Reconstructive memory

Many of the early studies of memory demonstrated how memories can fail to be accurate records of experiences. Because jurors and judges do not have access to the original event, it is important to know whether a testimony is based on actual experience or not.

In a 1932 study,  Frederic Bartlett demonstrated how serial reproduction of a story distorted accuracy in recalling information. He told participants a complicated Native American story and had them repeat it over a series of intervals. With each repetition, the stories were altered. Even when participants recalled accurate information, they filled in gaps with information that would fit their personal experiences. His work showed long-term memory to be adaptable. Bartlett viewed schemas as a major cause of this occurrence. People attempt to place past events into existing representations of the world, making the memory more coherent. Instead of remembering precise details about commonplace occurrences, a schema is developed. A schema is a generalization formed mentally based on experience. The common use of these schemas suggests that memory is not an identical reproduction of experience, but a combination of actual events with already existing schemas. Bartlett summarized this issue, explaining 

Further research of schemas shows memories that are inconsistent with a schema decay faster than those that match up with a schema. Tuckey and Brewer found pieces of information that were inconsistent with a typical robbery decayed much faster than those that were schema consistent over a 12-week period, unless the information stood out as being extremely unusual. The use of schemas has been shown to increase the accuracy of recall of schema-consistent information but this comes at the cost of decreased recall of schema-inconsistent information.

Misinformation effect

Elizabeth Loftus is one of the leading psychologists in the field of eyewitness testimony. She provided extensive research on this topic, revolutionizing the field with her bold stance that challenges the credibility of eyewitness testimony in court.  She suggests that memory is not reliable and goes to great lengths to provide support for her arguments. She mainly focuses on the integration of misinformation with the original memory, forming a new memory. Some of her most convincing experiments support this claim:
In one of her experiments, Loftus demonstrates that false verbal Information can integrate with original memory. Participants were presented with either truthful information or misleading information, and overall it showed that even the false information verbally presented became part of the memory after the participant was asked to recall details. This happens because of one of two reasons. First, it can alter the memory, incorporating the misinformation in with the actual, true memory. Second, the original memory and new information may both reside in memory in turn creating two conflicting ideas that compete in recall.
Loftus conducted more experiments to prove the reliability of expert psychological testimony versus the accepted basic eyewitness testimony. It was found that jurors who hear about a violent crime are more likely to convict a defendant than of one from a nonviolent crime. To reduce this tendency for a juror to quickly accuse, and perhaps wrongly accuse, choosing to utilize expert psychological testimony causes the juror to critically appraise the eyewitness testimony, instead of quickly reaching a faulty verdict.
Also, it has been shown that intelligence and gender has a role in the ability of accurate memory recall.  Participants were measured in eyewitness performance in two areas: 1) the ability to resist adding misinformation to the memory and 2) accuracy of recalling the incident and person.  It showed that when a woman was recalling information about a woman, the resistance to false details was higher and the recall was more accurate.  If a man was recalling an incident involving a man, similarly the recall was more accurate.  However, when dealing with opposite genders, the participants gave into the suggestibility (misinformation) more easily and demonstrated less accuracy.
Facial recognition is a good indicator of how easily memories can be manipulated. In this specific experiment, if a misleading feature was presented, more than a third of the participants recalled that detail. With a specific detail, almost 70% of people claimed that it had been there, when it had not been present.

Systematic variables

Type of questioning
As early as 1900, psychologists like Alfred Binet recorded how the phrasing of questioning during an investigation could alter witness response. Binet believed people were highly susceptible to suggestion, and called for a better approach to questioning witnesses.

A prime example of this is in the initial questioning process conducted by authorities. As an official investigation launches, police ask many questions ranging from race to weight of the perpetrator. All the information collected can be used to pull photographs of prime suspects or lead to a line up. If police suggest their own opinions, whether verbal or non-verbal, it can encourage a witness to change their mind or lead to guessing.

Studies conducted by Crombag (1996) discovered that in an incident involving a crew attempting to return to the airport but were unable to maintain flight and crashed into an 11-story apartment building. Though no cameras caught the moment of impact on film, many news stations covered the tragedy with footage taken after impact. Ten months after the event, the researchers interviewed people about the crash. According to theories about flashbulb memory, the intense shock of the event should have made the memory of the event incredibly accurate. This same logic is often applied to those who witness a criminal act. To test this assumption, participants were asked questions that planted false information about the event. Fifty-five percent of subjects reported having watched the moment of impact on television, and recalled the moment the plane broke out in flames-even though it was impossible for them to have seen either of these occurrences. One researcher remarked, "[V]ery critical sense would have made our subjects realize that the implanted information could not possibly be true. We are still at a loss as to why so few of them realized this."

A survey of research on the matter confirm eyewitness testimony consistently changes over time and based on the type of questioning. The approach investigators and lawyers take in their questioning has repeatedly shown to alter eyewitness response. One study showed changing certain words and phrases resulted in an increase in overall estimations of witnesses.

Improving eyewitness testimony
Law enforcement, legal professions, and psychologists have worked together in attempts to make eyewitness testimony more reliable and accurate. Geiselman, Fisher, MacKinnon, and Holland saw much improvement in eyewitness memory with an interview procedure they referred to as the cognitive interview. The approach focuses on making witness aware of all events surrounding a crime without generating false memories or inventing details. In this tactic,  the interviewer builds a rapport with the witness before asking any questions. They then allow the witness to provide an open ended account of the situation. The interviewer then asks follow up questions to clarify the witness' account, reminding the witness it is acceptable to be unsure and move on. This approach guides the witness over a rigid protocol. When implemented correctly, the CI showed more accuracy and efficiency without additional incorrect information being generated.

Currently, this is the U.S. Department of Justice's suggested method for law enforcement officials to use in obtaining information from witnesses. Programs training officers in this method have been developed outside the U.S. in many European countries, as well as Australia, New Zealand, and Israel.

While some analysis of police interviewing technique reveals this change towards CI interviewing is not put into effect by many officials in the US and the U.K., it is still considered to be the most effective means of decreasing error in eyewitness testimony.

Innocence Project 
Over the last decade, the Innocence Project has been gaining notoriety for its work within the judicial system providing help in exonerating those who have been wrongfully accused of various crimes. To do their part, the following are specific ways that they have suggested eyewitness identification can be more reliable.

The "double-blind" procedure or use of a blind administrator

A blind administrator lineup setting is where the person administering the lineup, i.e. an officer, does not know who the suspect actually is. By doing this, the officer is unable to give verbal indication to the eyewitness.

Instructions

Instructions can be key for eyewitness identifications. Proper instructions, such as telling them it is okay to not identify anyone, should be given before eyewitnesses try to identify an individual.

Composing the lineup

Composing the lineup is straight forward. If the suspect is in the lineup, the goal is to make he/she blend in with the people next to them. All people chosen to participate in the lineup should look like the initial descriptions of eyewitnesses.

Confidence statements

Confidence statements are statements provided by the eyewitness that will tell how confident they were in the choices they made in the lineup.

The lineup procedure should be documented

The lineup procedure should be documented by any means available. Most commonly video surveillance is used during the procedure. In some instances it may be helpful to have written documents providing descriptions of the procedure.

Procedural reforms
Experts debate what changes need to occur in the legal process in response to research on inaccuracy of eyewitness testimony.

Jury guidelines
It has been suggested that the jury be given a checklist to evaluate eyewitness testimony when given in court. R. J. Shafer offers this checklist for evaluating eyewitness testimony: 
 How well could the eyewitness observe the thing he reports? Were his senses equal to the observation? Was his physical location suitable to sight, hearing, touch? Did he have the proper social ability to observe: did he understand the language, have other expertise required (e.g., law, military)?
When did he report in relation to his observation? Soon? Much later?
Are there additional clues to intended veracity? Was he indifferent on the subject reported, thus probably not intending distortion? Did he make statements damaging to himself, thus probably not seeking to distort? Did he give incidental or casual information, almost certainly not intended to mislead?
Do his statements seem inherently improbable: e.g., contrary to human nature, or in conflict with what we know?
Remember that some types of information are easier to observe and report on than others.
Are there inner contradictions in the testimony?

Judge guidelines
In 2011, the New Jersey Supreme Court created new rules for the admissibility of eyewitness testimony in court. The new rules require judges to explain to jurors any influences that may heighten the risk for error in the testimony. The rules are part of nationwide court reform that attempts to improve the validity of eyewitness testimony and lower the rate of false conviction.

See also
 
  (false memory)

References

External links
 Identifying the Culprit: Assessing Eyewitness Identification (2014) - free download of book by the National Academy of Sciences summarizing research and recommending best practices
 Evidence-based justice: Corrupted memory, Nature, 14 Aug 2013
  (Massachusetts)

Cognitive psychology
Philosophy of science
Testimony
Testimony
Works about history